Phyllonorycter nepalensis is a moth of the family Gracillariidae. It is known from the Nepal.

The wingspan is 7.2 mm for males and 6 mm for female.

The larvae feed on Alnus nepalensis. They mine the leaves of their host plant. The mine has the form of a rather small, oblong or quadrate blotch occurring upon the lower side of the leaf, usually placed on the space between two lateral veins. The lower epidermis on the mining part is greenish-white in the early stage and brownish in fully developed stage, with many weak, longitudinal ridges in the tentiformed stage.

References

nepalensis
Moths of Asia
Moths described in 1973